DRMS may refer to: Dhyan Record Management & Consulting Services - 

 Defense Reutilization and Marketing Service, an entity that disposes of United States military surplus
 Digital rights management system — see Digital rights management
 Distributed resource management system (more commonly known as a job scheduler), a software that is in charge of unattended background executions in a distributed computing system
 Desert Ridge Middle School, a middle school in Albuquerque, New Mexico, USA
  Demand Response Management System